Johnny Dalton (10 August 1919 – 24 November 1982) was an Australian rules footballer who played with Melbourne in the Victorian Football League (VFL).

Dalton later served in the Australian Army during World War II.

Notes

External links 

1919 births
Australian rules footballers from Victoria (Australia)
Melbourne Football Club players
1982 deaths